Edward Sheffield Stephenson (February 9, 1917 – February 28, 2011) was an American art director and production designer. He won three Primetime Emmy Awards and was nominated for three more in the categories Outstanding Art Direction and Outstanding Variety Series for his work on the television programs The Danny Kaye Show, The Andy Williams Show, Soap, The Golden Girls and the television special An Evening with Fred Astaire. 

Stephenson died in February 2011, after complications of Alzheimer's disease and pneumonia at his home in Hollywood Hills, California, at the age of 94.

References

External links 

1917 births
2011 deaths
People from Algona, Iowa
American art directors
American production designers
Primetime Emmy Award winners
Deaths from Alzheimer's disease
Deaths from dementia in California
Deaths from pneumonia in California